Oakwood Cemetery is a cemetery located in Fremont, Ohio, United States.

Notable interments
United States President Rutherford B. Hayes (1822–1893) was buried here in 1893, and his body was moved to his former home, Spiegel Grove, in 1915 for burial with his wife Lucy Ware Hayes (1831–1889). Cenotaphs are maintained for them at Oakwood.

Other notable interments include:
 Carl C. Anderson (1877–1912) US Congreeman
 William Francis Bailey (1842–1915) Wisconsin judge
 John S. Bell (1796–1869) US Congressman
 Ralph Pomeroy Buckland (1812–1892) Civil War Union Brigadier General and US Congressman
 Rodolphus Dickinson (1797–1849) US Congressman
 Edward F. Dickinson (1829–1891) his son, US Congressman
 William Elisha Haynes (1829–1914) US Congressman
 Amos Henry Jackson (1846–1924) US Congressman
 John Birchard Rice (1832–1893) US Congressman

References

External links
 
 

Cemeteries in Sandusky County, Ohio
Fremont, Ohio
Geography of Sandusky County, Ohio